Albion is a single player role-playing video game developed and published by Blue Byte for MS-DOS in 1995. It was originally released in German, then translated to English for international release. The game uses a science fiction setting that incorporates traditional fantasy elements, such as magic.

The game was intended to be developed for the Amiga computer, but Commodore declared bankruptcy. Albion can be considered a spiritual successor to the Amiga role-playing video games Amberstar and Ambermoon, bearing very similar gameplay and developed by the same core team (Erik Simon - design, Jurie Horneman - code, Thorsten Mutschall - graphics, Matthias Steinwachs - sound and music, and Dieter Rottermund - artwork) under the Thalion Software name.

The game was re-released in 2015 on Gog.com with support for Microsoft Windows.

Plot
In the year 2230, the gigantic, interstellar space ship Toronto emerges from hyperspace at the edge of a distant planetary system. The ship's owners, the multinational DDT corporation, believe that there are rich deposits of raw materials on one of the planets in the system, and the Toronto is to mine the whole planet's resources at once. The player is cast in the role of Tom Driscoll, the pilot of the exploration shuttle sent to verify the status of the planet. His shuttle malfunctions, forcing him to make a crash landing. Tom discovers that the data that described the planet as a desert world was false. Albion is a world teeming with life, secrets, surprises, and magic. It is inhabited by the sentient, tall and slender, feline-like humanoids called Iskai and the many divisions of Celtic humans that traveled magically to the planet in their era. It is up to Driscoll to alert the crew of the Toronto to the true situation to save Albion and its inhabitants.

Gameplay
Albion is a role-playing video game and features a number of gameplay elements typical of that genre. The player controls a party of up to six characters, each with their own skills and abilities. With these characters they may explore the game world, fight enemies, and engage in conversation or trade. Characters earn experience points by defeating enemies or by solving certain puzzles. When a character has sufficient experience points they will advance in level, increasing their maximum life and spell points. They will also receive training points which can be expended at a trainer to permanently increase one or more of their skills.

Albion uses a hybrid 2D/3D graphical system to depict its environments. Most interior locations are shown using a 2D overhead view, centered on the player's party. Movement is possible using either the keyboard or the mouse and the mouse is used to examine or manipulate objects within the reach of the party leader. A similar view is used when exploring the larger world outside the cities, but with objects and characters shown on a much smaller scale. Upon entering most dungeons, caves, and the exteriors of larger cities the game switches to a real-time first-person 3D view. As in the 2D view, players may use the mouse or keyboard to move around and the mouse is used to select objects to interact with. A 2D automap is available to assist navigation in these areas.

Combat occurs when the party runs into one or more enemies. The combat system is turn-based and takes place on a five-by-six grid similar to a chess board, with the player's characters arranged at the bottom and their enemies at the top. At the start of each turn, the player selects an action for each character to perform: Attack, Move, Use magic, Use Item, or Flee. The order in which party members and enemies execute their actions depends on their relative speeds and is an important tactical consideration. Since attacks are targeted at a grid square rather than the character or enemy in it, attacks will miss if their intended target moves before they are made, even if that target is still within reach. The movement of the player's characters is limited to the bottom two rows, but there is also an 'Advance Party' option which moves all enemies one row towards the party.

Reception

Writing for PC Gamer US, Michael Wolf called Albion "a fun, engrossing, and involved roleplaying experience", with "all the elements of a great roleplaying adventure." In Computer Gaming World, Petra Schlunk wrote, "I found this lengthy game enjoyable to play and recommend it to lovers of role-playing games when another dry spell hits." The game was a finalist for Computer Gaming Worlds 1996 "Role-Playing Game of the Year" award, which ultimately went to The Elder Scrolls II: Daggerfall. The reviewer for Next Generation called Albion "well-thought out and definitely worth checking out", and praised it as a "bright spot in the desert" of computer role-playing games at the time.

Chuck Klimushyn of Computer Games Strategy Plus considered Albion to be "a breath of fresh air for the RPG crowd", and he wrote that "those who cut their teeth on the likes of Might and Magic, Wizardry, and Ultima may find that the future looks a little brighter because of this latest offering from Blue Byte." The magazine later nominated Albion as its 1996 role-playing game of the year.

Albion was a runner-up for Computer Game Entertainments 1996 "Best Role-Playing Game" prize. The magazine's editors wrote, "Albion was refreshing, not only because it helped fill a void, but because it carefully balanced story, puzzles, combat and exploration." It was also nominated in this category by CNET Gamecenter, whose editors gave the prize to Meridian 59.

Legacy
In 2011 a port for ARM architecture and the Pandora handheld was created by fans via static recompilation from the original x86 binary executable. The community still updates this recompiled version and released also a Windows and Linux build in 2015.

On July 29, 2015, Albion was re-released on the digital distributor GOG.com, albeit only the original version and DOSBox, not the newer port.

References

External links
Official website (archive)

1995 video games
Blue Byte games
Cancelled Amiga games
DOS games
Games commercially released with DOSBox
Role-playing video games
Science fiction video games
Video games about cats
Video games about extraterrestrial life
Video games developed in Germany
Video games set on fictional planets
Windows games
Single-player video games